Te Whānau-ā-Apanui is a Māori iwi (Iwi is the Māori word for tribe) located in the eastern Bay of Plenty and East Coast regions of New Zealand's North Island. In 2006, the iwi registered 11,808 members, representing 13 hapū.

History

Early history
During the 17th century, Apanui acquired vast amounts of land along the East Coast of the North Island. Through familial connection, he acquired land from Ngāti Porou and Ngāriki. He was given land extending from Pōtikirua to Puketapu, and from Taumata-ō-Apanui Hawai; the land in between was later won through conquest.

Modern history

Relations with Europeans were not generally hostile. Early European settlers showed little interest in the isolated region, which lacked deep-water harbours for shipping. However, visiting Europeans taught Te Whānau-ā-Apanui the skills of whaling and commercial agriculture. Both areas become major economic industries for the iwi in the early 20th century, and profits were directed into community development projects.

During the 1980s, the iwi experienced economic decline with the loss of major transport services, privatization of state assets and the eventual economic unfeasibility of its small-scale farming operations. This resulted in some emigration of iwi members from traditional tribal homelands.

There are three groups that have competed at The Matatini from Te Whānau a Apanui: Te Kapa Haka o Te Whānau a Apanui (3x Champions 2005, 2015 and 2023), Tutawake and Tauira-mai-tawhiti.

Hapū and marae

The iwi (tribe) consists of 13 hapū (sub-tribes).

Each is associated with a marae (communal ground) and wharenui (meeting house). Ki

 Te Whānau a Haraawaka, of Tunapahore marae and Haraawaka wharenui
 Te Whānau a Hikarukutai, of Maraenui marae and Te Iwarau wharenui
 Te Whānau a Kahurautao, of Pāhāōa and Kahurautao wharenui
 Te Whānau a Kaiaio, of Maungaroa marae and Kaiaio	wharenui
 Te Whānau a Kauaetangohia, of Whangaparāōa marae and Kauaetangohia / Te Putahou wharenui
 Te Whānau a Maruhaeremuri, of Wairūrū marae and Hinemahuru / Mihi Kotukutuko wharenui
 Te Whānau a Nuku, of Ōmāio marae and Rongomaihuatahi wharenui
 Te Whānau a Pararaki, of Te Maru o Hinemaka marae and Pararaki wharenui
 Te Whānau a Rutaia, of Ōtūwhare marae and Te Poho o Rūtāia wharenui, and Rongohaere marae and Rongohaere wharenui
 Te Whānau a Tapaeururangi, of Pōtaka marae and Te Ēhutu / Te Pae o Ngā Pakanga wharenui
 Te Whānau a Te Ēhutu, of Te Kaha marae and Tūkākī wharenui
 Te Whānau a Toihau / Hiinetekahu, of Waiōrore marae and Toihau wharenui
 Te Whānau a Tutawake, of Whitianga marae and Tūtawake	wharenui

Governance

Te Rūnanga o te Whānau

Te Rūnanga o te Whānau represents Te Whānau a Apanui during resource consent applications under the Resource Management Act, but forwards each application on to the directly affected hapū. It is based on Te Kaha, and governed by representatives from at least ten hapū.

The charitable trust is involved in social services and local economic development. It manages a fisheries operation, and invests in the development of local forestry and other industries. Its Cyberwaka rural community project provides information technology training.

Negotiations team

The Crown has recognised Te Whānau a Apanui Negotiations Team to represent the iwi during Treaty of Waitangi settlement negotiations. The terms of the negotiation were signed with the Crown in September 2017.

Local government

The tribal area of the iwi is within the territory of the Ōpōtiki District Council.

It is also within the wider territory of Bay of Plenty Regional Council.

Media

Sea 92FM

Pan-tribal iwi station Sea 92FM broadcasts to members of Te Whānau-ā-Apanui, Te Whakatōhea and Ngāitai in the Ōpōtiki area. It operates the low-power Opotiki 88.1 FM, geared towards a young demographic.

Boy (Movie) 
In 2010, Taika Waititi directed and acted in Boy, which was a film based in Te Whānau-ā-Apanui.

Notable people

 Mihi Kōtukutuku Stirling Māori tribal leader and orator
 Dr Rina Winifred Moore, first female Māori doctor
 Ākenehi Hei, Māori district nurse, midwife, first Māori to become a qualified nurse
 Fanny Howie, singer and composer
 Tame Poata, tohunga moko, master moko artist
 Karauria Tiweka Anaru, New Zealand interpreter, law clerk, local politician and community leader 
 Hoani Waititi, educationalist and community leader 
 Archbishop Brown Turei, Bishop of Aotearoa – the Tikanga Māori Archbishop and Primate of the Anglican Church in New Zealand, Aotearoa and Polynesia.
 Major John Hikitia Te Rangi Waititi, army commander of the 28th Maori Battalion (C Company)
 Roka Paora, Māori language expert, translator, author and educator
 Wiremu Karuwha Tawhai, educator and actor
 Moana-Nui-a-Kiwa Ngarimu, first Māori recipient of the Victoria Cross for New Zealand medal, 28th Maori Battalion (C Company) 
 Willie Apiata, second Māori recipient of the Victoria Cross for New Zealand medal
 Sir Monita Delamere, rugby player (Māori All Blacks), Ringatū faith leader and community leader
 Dame June Mariu (née Waititi), first Māori captain and first winning captain of the Silver Ferns, Māori community leader, educator and sportswoman
 Sir Wira Gardiner, soldier, public servant, and writer
 Cliff Whiting, artist
 Dean Whiting, artist and restoration expert
 Paratene Matchitt, sculptor and painter
 Roka Ngarimu-Cameron, master weaver
 Taiarahia Black, academic, professor and father of Otere Black
 George Gage, Ringatū faith leader
 Albert Oliphant Stewart, tribal leader, law clerk, interpreter, local politician, rate collector
 Rona Hurley , tobacco grower and buyer
 Anne Delamere, New Zealand public servant
 Pae Ruha, Māori leader, educator
 Witi Ihimaera, author, writer, academic
 Pāora Kīngi Delamere, Ringatū faith leader, carpenter, boat builder, farmer
 Heta Hingston, lawyer, jurist, judge of the Māori Land Court 1984-1999, and Chief Justice of Niue until 2010
 Tuariki Delamere, former politician (Minister of Immigration, Minister of Pacific Island Affairs, Associate Minister of Finance, and Associate Minister of Health)
 Claudette Hauiti, politician
 Rawiri Waititi, politician, co-leader of Te Pāti Māori
 Taika Waititi, filmmaker
 Tweedie Waititi, filmmaker
 Ainsley Gardiner, film producer
 Riwia Brown, playwriter and screenwriter
 Whirimako Black, musician
 Rob Ruha, musician, weaver, artist
 Maisey Rika, musician
 Troy Kingi, musician
 Ria Hall, musician
 Leonard Tamahae Cohen, Bluegrass musician, Founding member Hamilton County Bluegrass Band
 Tayi Tibble, poet
 Olivia Aroha Giles, contemporary creative specialising in art textiles, design, illustration and writing
 Kahurangi Waititi, netball player
 Kerry-Anne Tomlinson, cricket player
 Reuben Parkinson, rugby player (Japan NRU Team) and older brother of Matua Parkinson
 Matua Parkinson, rugby player (Māori All Blacks, and NZ Sevens Team), tv personality and younger brother of Reuben Parkinson
 Charlie Ngatai, rugby player Māori All Blacks 
 Sandra Ioane (née Wihongi), rugby player (Black Ferns) and mother of Akira & Rieko Ioane
 Akira Ioane, rugby player (Māori All Blacks, All Blacks and NZ Sevens Team)
 Rieko Ioane, rugby player (Māori All Blacks, All Blacks and NZ Sevens Team)
 Ruahei Demant, rugby player (Black Ferns captain)
 Kiritapu Demant, rugby player (Black Ferns), barber
 Stacey Fluhler, rugby player (Black Ferns and NZ Sevens Team) and sister to Beaudein Waaka 
 Beaudein Waaka, rugby player (NZ Sevens Team) and brother to Stacey Fluhler 
 Natalie Delamere, rugby player (Black Ferns)
 Luka Connor, rugby player (Black Ferns)
 Pari Pari Parkinson, rugby player (Māori All Blacks)
 Otere Black, rugby player (Māori All Blacks) and son of Taiarahia Black
 Hoani Matenga, rugby player (Māori All Blacks)
 Kharl Wirepa, fashion designer
 Te Kapa Haka o Te Whānau-ā-Apanui (3x Te Matatini Champions 2005, 2015 and 2023)

See also
List of Māori iwi

References

 
Bay of Plenty Region
Gisborne District